The Finnish railway network consists of a total track length of . These services cover all major cities and many rural areas, though the coverage is less than the coverage provided by the bus services. Most passenger train services originate or terminate at Helsinki Central railway station, and a large proportion of the passenger rail network radiates out of Helsinki. VR also operates freight services. Maintenance and construction of the railway network itself is the responsibility of the Finnish Rail Administration, which is a part of the Finnish Transport Agency. The network consists of six areal centres, that manage the use and maintenance of the routes in co-operation. Cargo yards and large stations may have their own signalling systems.

Finnish trains have a reputation for being spacious, comfortable and clean. The scenery surrounding the railway lines is considered to be of outstanding natural beauty, especially in Eastern Finland with its many lakes. Since the density of population is low in most parts of Finland, the country is not very well suited to railways. Commuter services are nowadays rare outside the Helsinki area, but there are express train connections between most of the cities. As in France, passenger services are mostly connections from various parts of the country to the capital, Helsinki. Currently there are about 260 passenger round trips driven daily in Finland, excluding Helsinki commuter rail. In addition there are also good long-distance bus and airplane connections; buses are sometimes faster and/or cheaper than trains (e.g. Helsinki–Pori).

History

The first rail line between Helsinki and Hämeenlinna (today part of the Finnish Main Line) was opened on January 31, 1862. As Finland was then the Grand Duchy of Finland, an autonomous region of Imperial Russia, railways were built to the broad , that was used in Imperial Russia back then. An extension from Riihimäki to the new Finland Station in Saint Petersburg was opened in 1870.
However, the Finnish and Russian rail systems remained unconnected until 1912. Russian trains could not have used the Finnish rail network due to a narrower load gauge. Later the Finnish load gauge was widened to match the Russian load gauge, with hundreds of station platforms or tracks moved further apart from each other.

Further expansion occurred in the 1800s and by 1900 much of the network had been constructed with 3,300 km of track built.

The Finland Railway Bridge across the River Neva in Saint Petersburg, opened in 1912, connected the Finnish State Railways to Russian Railways. Following Finnish independence, the Russian part of the line was handed over to Russia.

Future expansion

Track upgrades
Track doubling projects are taking place in various sections of the Finnish rail network. Following a previous project to double the single-line sections of railway from Seinäjoki to Oulu which was completed in 2017, the Luumäki-Imatra(-Simpele) section will be fully doubled by 2023.

New lines

Since the 1970s the Finnish Transport Agency has been discussing the possibility of building a Helsinki–Turku high-speed railway, allowing for a faster journey time between the two cities. An updated feasibility study was undertaken in 2005, and in 2016 the line was included as a policy in the Finnish Transport Agency's report. This line forms part of the Finnish government's plans to build high-speed rail links from Helsinki to Turku, Tampere and Kouvola.

The planned Itärata (East Rail) would link Helsinki and Kouvola via Porvoo, shortening journey times to eastern Finnish cities such as Kuopio and Joensuu. More direct lines from Helsinki to Pori and Jyväskylä have also been studied.

In November 2017 a freight train left Kouvola between Helsinki and the Russian border carrying 41 containers for Xi’an in China. This was the first freight train of its type to travel between the two countries. The 9,110 km journey via Russia and Kazakhstan is expected to take 17 days, compared to around 30 days by sea and rail. This service is expected to become a daily departure in the coming months.

Proposals for a rail link to Lapland in northern Finland, via Kemijärvi or Kolari, from the Norwegian port of Kirkenes are in the planning stages. However, environmental and cultural sensitivities exist which affect these plans, with concerns from the indigenous Sámi people that the proposed line would pass through reindeer grazing lands.

Also, new rail link from Simpele to Elisenvaara, with track doubling and electrification at 25 kV 50 Hz AC from Elisenvaara via Sortavala and Suoyarvi to Petrozavodsk is now proposed, for passenger trains (with Finnish bilevel coaches) from Helsinki to Petrozavodsk, Kirov, Krasnoyarsk, and Khabarovsk (via Baikal-Amur Mainline).

Operators 
The national railway company VR had a monopoly on passenger transport. In Helsinki local traffic, class Sm5 EMUs are owned by Pääkaupunkiseudun Junakalusto Oy, but are operated by VR.

While private rail operators can transport freight since 2007, most trains are still run by VR. Ratarahti Oy was granted its safety certificate by the Finnish Transport Safety Agency in September 2011 and it will start shunting work at the Imatra rail yard in 2013, with first test runs on 5 December 2012. Fenniarail Oy received its safety certificate in May 2011  and has started using used locomotives from Czech Republic, which were converted to the Finnish gauge of 1524mm, and started operation in July 2016.

One private railway company exists in Finland, the Karhula–Sunila Railroad, a short branch line with freight traffic only, in Karhula, near Kotka. The branch line is not managed by the Finnish Transport Authority but by the railway owner.

Several museum railways exist that are unrelated to VR Group.

Technical facts

Rail network size 
Total track length including sidings 
Total length of passenger railway routes 
Electrified routes

Electrification

While some private Finnish railways were electrified already at the end of the 19th century, work on the electrification of the main rail network started only in the late 1960s. Most main lines are now electrified. The largest class of electric locomotives are the Sr1 locomotives that were taken into use in 1973. They are now supplemented by the Sr2- and Sr3-class electric locomotives and the high-speed Sm3 Pendolino units.

The first electric trains started to operate on 26 January 1969 in Helsinki local traffic, initially between Helsinki and Kirkkonummi and slowly extending to Riihimäki on 31 January 1972. Heading northwards, the electric wires reached Seinäjoki in 1975, Kokkola in 1981, Oulu in 1983, Rovaniemi in 2004, and their current northernmost point in Kemijärvi in 2014. In addition to the line to Kemijärvi, another line recently electrified was the line from Seinäjoki to Vaasa in 2011.

The next railway line to be electrified is the railway from Turku to Uusikaupunki, electrification is scheduled to begin in 2019.

Running speeds 

Actual speed limits vary depending on the train type and track portion. Some delays can occur in autumn and winter due to weather conditions (e.g. high winds).

Safety 

The signalling system used on the railway network in Finland comprises color-light signals and fixed signs. They are used together with ATP-VR/RHK (EBICAB 900), a train protection system usually referred to as JKV which has to be used on rolling stock. The system is set to be upgraded to ERTMS/ETCS in the upcoming years, however later than in other European countries due to the low age of the current train protection system. The first ETCS units are set to be installed in rolling stock during 2013, and the first ERTMS signalled portion of track should be opened between 2019 and 2025.

Platform heights 

The sole exception on the national railway network is the Nikkilä halt which has a platform height of 400 mm (15.8 in).

There are current proposed figures:

Lines

Most passenger rail services in Finland radiate from Helsinki Central, serving most major cities including Tampere, Turku, Oulu, Rovaniemi, Kouvola, Kuopio, Jyväskylä and Joensuu among others. Some towns are connected to the rail network by their own branch lines, yet are not served by passenger trains; examples include Porvoo, Uusikaupunki, Raahe and Rauma.

Railway links to adjacent countries
 Small break of gauge
 Russia – small break of gauge /. This is within the tolerances and through running is done.
Vainikkala – Buslovskaya — electrified, but different voltage 25 kV AC – 3 kV DC
Niirala – Vyartsilya — electrification missing
Imatrankoski – Svetogorsk — electrification missing
Vartius – Kostomuksha — electrified on Finnish side only — Russian side to be electrified at 25 kV 50 Hz AC in 2018–2019.
 Break of gauge
 Sweden – break of gauge – /; change of voltage 25 kV AC/15 kV AC, however there are no electrified lines that cross the border.
 There are also  train ferries to Stockholm and standard gauge track at the ferry terminal at Turku.
 Germany – /; There are  train ferries to Sassnitz/Mukran and  train ferries to Travemünde.
 Proposed
 Estonia – 
Central route: proposed Helsinki to Tallinn Tunnel, which would be part of the Rail Baltica project.
Eastern route: proposed fixed link from Kotka to Tapa.
Western route: proposed fixed link from Hanko to Haapsalu.
 Norway – proposed railway line via Skibotn to Tromsø.
 Russia – proposed railway lines from Kemijärvi to Kandalaksha, from Imatra to Elisenvaara, from Parikkala to Elisenvaara, from Parikkala to Sortavala, from Joensuu to Medvezhyegorsk, from Hirvakoski to Kem, and from Kuusamo to Louhi.
 Sweden – proposed railway tunnel or bridge Vaasa-Umeå
 Lithuania (via Sweden) - proposed railway fixed link from Uusikaupunki via Stokholm and Gotland Island to Klaipeda.

Before sanctions towards Russia, the freight railway traffic between Finland and Russia was more intensive, compared to between Sweden and Finland. There was also few daily passenger trains between Russia and Finland.

Metros, trams and light rail
Helsinki Metro (1522 mm gauge)
Helsinki tram (1000 mm gauge)
Jokeri light rail (1000 mm gauge)
Tampere light rail (1435 mm gauge)

See also

 Transport in Finland
 VR (company)
 High-speed rail in Finland
 List of railway lines in Finland
 List of Finnish locomotives
 Finnish Railway Museum
 Finnish Rail Administration
 Finnish railway signalling
 List of Finnish municipalities without scheduled railway services
 Narrow gauge railways in Finland
 Unilink coupler 
 Dual coupling

References

Sources 
 
 
 
 \

External links

 Rail Network 
  illustrated description of Finland's railways in the 1930s